Krasny Log is a rural locality (a settlement) and the administrative center of Krasnologskoye Rural Settlement, Anninsky District, Voronezh Oblast, Russia. The population was 242 as of 2010. There are 5 streets.

Geography 
Krasny Log is located 60 km east of Anna (the district's administrative centre) by road. Krasny is the nearest rural locality.

References 

Rural localities in Anninsky District